The Daly Basin, an interim Australian bioregion, is located in the Northern Territory, comprising an area of  of central Arnhem Land in the Top End of the Northern Territory.

The bioregion includes gently undulating plains with scattered low plateau remnants and some rocky hills and gorges along its western edge. The dominant vegetation is Darwin woolybutt (Eucalyptus miniata) and stringybark open forests. Land uses include extensive grazing, intensive horticulture, and tourism. There are also areas of Aboriginal land.

See also

 Geography of Australia

References

Arnhem Land
IBRA regions
Kimberley tropical savanna